Elaine Gray (born 29 May 1958) is a British former swimmer. She competed in two events at the 1976 Summer Olympics.

References

External links
 

1958 births
Living people
British female swimmers
Olympic swimmers of Great Britain
Swimmers at the 1976 Summer Olympics
Place of birth missing (living people)